The Craig-Beasley House, also known as Gaines House, is a  property in Franklin, Tennessee that was listed on the National Register of Historic Places in 2003.  The listing includes four contributing buildings:  a 1916-built American Craftsman-style house and compatible 1953-built outbuildings (a garage/greenhouse, a stable, and a storage shed).

It is believed that the house was designed and built by local lumber mill owner and builder J.F. Craig.

References

Houses on the National Register of Historic Places in Tennessee
Houses in Franklin, Tennessee
American Craftsman architecture in Tennessee
Bungalow architecture in Tennessee
Houses completed in 1916
National Register of Historic Places in Williamson County, Tennessee